Wilsonton Heights is a residential locality of Toowoomba in the Toowoomba Region, Queensland, Australia.

Geography

The locality is mostly residential, and contains Wilsonton State High School.

History
The locality is named after James T. Wilson, a Toowoomba businessman. He was involved with the Toowoomba Agricultural Society and unsuccessfully contests the Queensland Legislative Assembly seat of Darling Downs in 1878.

In 2006 the suburb of Wilsonton Heights was split from the suburb of Wilsonton.

The Wilsonton campus of Toowoomba State High School opened in 1998 as the fourth secondary campus for Toowoomba's youth. As at 2015, the campus catered for approximately 840 students (2015) in Years 7 to 12.

On 9 August 2016, Education Minister Kate Jones announced that the Wilsonton campus would be separated from the Toowoomba State High School. The new Wilsonton State High School opened on the first school day in 2017 (23 January 2017). The new name for the school was decided  through a community consultation process.

Education 
Wilsonton State School is a government primary (Prep - 6) school for boys and girls at 429 Bridge Street (27.3215.8°S 151.5530.1°E) and is part of the main catchment area for Wilsonton State High School.

Wilsonton State High School is a government secondary (7-12) school for boys and girls at 275 North Street. In 2017, the school had an enrolment of 678 students with 69 teachers (65 full-time equivalent) and 37 non-teaching staff (28 full-time equivalent). It includes a special education program.

Wilsonton Agricultural Environmental Education Centre is an Outdoor and Environmental Education Centre at 275 North Street.

Amenities 
Toowoomba Wesleyan Methodist Church is at 267 North Street. It is part of the Wesleyan Methodist Church of Australia.

References

External links
 Suburb profile

Suburbs of Toowoomba
2006 establishments in Australia
Populated places established in 2006
Localities in Queensland